Dacnophora is a genus of flies in the family Phoridae.

Species
D. brevipes Borgmeier, 1961
D. discreta Borgmeier, 1961
D. legionis Borgmeier, 1961
D. macrochaeta Borgmeier, 1961
D. pectinatus Brown, 1988
D. setithorax Borgmeier, 1961

References

Phoridae
Platypezoidea genera